The following is a list of Teen Choice Award winners and nominees for Choice Summer Music Star: Female. It was first introduced in 2010. Selena Gomez, Demi Lovato and Camila Cabello are the only artists to win this award twice.

Winners and nominees

References

Summer Music Star Female
Music Star Female